Anta Ranra (quechua anta copper, ranra stony, stony place, "stony copper place", also spelled Antarangra) is a mountain in the Andes of Peru which reaches an altitude of approximately . It is located in the Lima Region, Huarochirí Province, Huanza District. Anta Ranra lies south of a lake named P'itiqucha.

References

Mountains of Peru
Mountains of Lima Region